= Krastciems =

Neighbourhood of Jurmala, Latvia

Coordinates: 56°56′N 23°41′E

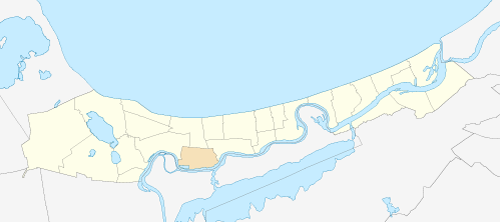
- Location in Jūrmala
- Country: Latvia
- City: Jūrmala

Area
  - Total: 3.6 km^{2} (1.4 sq mi)
- Elevation: 3 m (9.8 ft)

Population (2008)
  - Total: 456
  - Density: 126.7/km^{2} (328/sq mi)

Krastciems is a residential area and neighbourhood of the city Jūrmala, Latvia.
